

C 

 
 
 7317 Cabot
 2997 Cabrera
 
 
 
 
 161989 Cacus
 
 
 7092 Cadmus
 297 Caecilia
 57424 Caelumnoctu
 
 6377 Cagney
 
 
 952 Caia
 
 
 
 12359 Cajigal
 
 
 
 8967 Calandra
 
 
 
 
 
 
 
 
 
 
 
 
 
 341 California
 
 
 19738 Calinger
 
 19741 Callahan
 
 
 
 
 2542 Calpurnia
 2906 Caltech
 
 1245 Calvinia
 
 
 
 5653 Camarillo
 
 2531 Cambridge
 
 
 
 957 Camelia
 
 30000 Camenzind
 2980 Cameron
 
 
 
 
 
 107 Camilla
 
 
 
 3752 Camillo
 
 5160 Camoes
 16879 Campai
 
 377 Campania
 1077 Campanula
 2751 Campbell
 
 8776 Campestris
 
 
 
 12696 Camus
 
 
 
 
 4899 Candace
 
 
 3015 Candy
 
 
 
 
 
 
 1120 Cannonia
 
 
 740 Cantabia
 
 3563 Canterbury
 
 
 
 
 
 
 
 1931 Čapek
 
 
 
 
 
 49777 Cappi
 
 479 Caprera
 
 
 
 
 
 
 
 
 
 
 
 
 
 
 
 
 
 
 
 1391 Carelia
 3578 Carestia
 
 
 
 
 491 Carina
 
 78816 Caripito
 1470 Carla
 
 
 
 
 
 4362 Carlisle
 
 
 
 
 
 
 
 
 
 
 
 
 
 
 
 360 Carlova
 
 
 
 
 
 
 
 26074 Carlwirtz
 
 
 
 
 
 
 
 
 
 558 Carmen
 
 
 
 
 671 Carnegia
 
 
 
 
 
 
 
 
 
 
 235 Carolina
 
 
 
 
 
 
 
 
 
 
 
 
 
 
 
 4446 Carolyn
 
 
 
 
 
 
 
 
 1852 Carpenter
 
 
 
 
 
 
 
 
 
 
 
 
 
 
 
 
 
 
 
 
 
 
 
 
 
 
 
 
 
 
 
 
 
 
 
 
 
 
 
 
 
 
 
 
 
 
 
 
 
 
 
 
 
 24101 Cassini
 1683 Castafiore
 
 4769 Castalia
 
 
 
 
 
 
 
 
 
 
 
 
 
 
 
 
 
 
 
 
 
 
 
 
 
 
 
 
 
 
 
 
 
 
 
 
 1116 Catriona
 
 
 
 
 
 
 505 Cava
 
 
 
 
 
 
 
 
 
 
 
 
 
 
 
 
 
 2363 Cebriones
 
 
 
 
 
 
 
 
 
 
 
 
 
 
 
 1252 Celestia
 
 
 
 
 
 3782 Celle
 
 
 
 
 
 
 186 Celuta
 
 1240 Centenaria
 513 Centesima
 
 
 133528 Ceragioli
 807 Ceraskia
 1865 Cerberus
 
 
 1 Ceres
 
 
 
 
 
 
 
 
 
 
 
 
 
 
 
 
 
 
 
 
 
 
 
 
 
 
 
 2747 Český Krumlov
 
 
 
 65489 Ceto
 
 31641 Cevasco
 
 1333 Cevenola
 
 
 
 
 1622 Chacornac
 
 
 
 2981 Chagall
 
 
 
 1671 Chaika
 
 
 
 1246 Chaka
 
 313 Chaldaea
 
 3960 Chaliubieju
 
 
 
 
 
 
 
 
 
 
 
 
 1958 Chandra
 
 
 
 
 
 
 
 
 
 
 
 
 
 
 
 
 
 
 
 
 
 1707 Chantal
 
 
 
 
 
 
 19521 Chaos
 21436 Chaoyichi
 
 
 
 
 
 
 
 
 
 
 
 10199 Chariklo
 627 Charis
 
 
 
 
 
 
 
 
 
 
 
 
 
 
 
 
 
 
 
 
 
 
 
 
 1510 Charlois
 543 Charlotte
 
 
 
 
 16070 Charops
 
 
 
 388 Charybdis
 
 
 
 
 
 
 
 
 
 
 
 
 2984 Chaucer
 
 
 
 
 
 1804 Chebotarev
 2010 Chebyshev
 
 
 
 
 
 
 
 
 
 
 21088 Chelyabinsk
 
 
 
 
 
 
 
 
 
 
 
 
 
 
 
 
 
 
 
 
 
 
 
 
 
 
 
 
 
 
 
 
 
 
 
 
 
 
 
 
 
 
 
 
 
 2325 Chernykh
 
 77185 Cherryh
 
 
 568 Cheruskia
 
 
 
 6042 Cheshirecat
 
 
 
 
 
 
 
 
 
 
 
 
 
 
 
 
 
 
 334 Chicago
 
 
 
 
 
 
 
 
 
 
 
 
 
 
 
 
 
 
 
 623 Chimaera
 1633 Chimay
 
 
 
 1125 China
 
 
 
 
 
 4429 Chinmoy
 
 
 
 
 
 
 
 
 2060 Chiron
 
 
 
 
 
 
 
 
 
 
 402 Chloë
 
 
 
 410 Chloris
 938 Chlosinde
 
 
 
 
 
 
 
 
 
 
 
 
 
 
 
 
 
 
 
 
 
 
 
 
 
 
 
 
 
 
 
 
 
 
 
 
 
 
 
 
 
 
 
 
 
 
 
 
 
 
 
 
 
 
 1015 Christa
 
 
 
 
 
 
 
 
 
 
 
 
 
 
 628 Christine
 
 
 
 
 
 
 
 
 
 17246 Christophedumas
 
 
 
 
 
 
 
 
 
 
 
 
 
 
 202 Chryseïs
 637 Chrysothemis
 
 
 
 
 
 
 
 
 
 
 
 
 
 
 
 
 
 
 
 
 
 
 
 
 
 
 
 
 
 
 
 
 
 
 
 
 
 
 
 
 
 
 
 
 
 
 
 
 
 
 
 
 
 
 
 
 
 
 
 
 
 
 
 
 
 
 1275 Cimbria
 
 1307 Cimmeria
 1373 Cincinnati
 
 
 
 
 
 
 
 
 
 
 
 
 
 
 34 Circe
 
 
 
 
 
 
 
 
 
 2420 Čiurlionis
 
 
 
 
 
 
 
 
 
 642 Clara
 
 
 
 
 
 
 302 Clarissa
 
 4923 Clarke
 
 
 
 
 
 311 Claudia
 
 
 
 11264 Claudiomaccone
 
 
 
 
 
 
 
 
 
 
 
 1101 Clematis
 1919 Clemence
 
 
 
 252 Clementina
 
 
 
 
 385695 Clete
 6296 Cleveland
 
 4276 Clifford
 
 
 3034 Climenhaga
 
 1982 Cline
 
 
 
 
 935 Clivia
 5511 Cloanthus
 
 661 Cloelia
 282 Clorinde
 
 
 
 
 
 
 
 
 
 
 
 
 
 
 
 
 
 
 2939 Coconino
 
 
 
 237 Coelestina
 
 
 
 
 
 1764 Cogshall
 
 972 Cohnia
 
 
 
 
 
 
 
 
 
 1135 Colchis
 5635 Cole
 
 
 
 
 
 
 
 
 
 
 
 
 
 
 
 
 
 
 
 
 
 327 Columbia
 
 
 489 Comacina
 1655 Comas Solà
 
 
 
 
 
 
 
 
 
 
 
 
 
 
 
 
 
 58 Concordia
 
 
 
 
 
 
 
 
 29292 Conniewalker
 
 
 
 
 
 
 
 
 
 
 
 
 
 
 315 Constantia
 
 
 
 
 
 
 
 
 
 
 815 Coppelia
 
 1322 Coppernicus
 
 
 504 Cora
 
 
 
 
 
 2442 Corbett
 4008 Corbin
 
 
 2942 Cordie
 365 Corduba
 
 
 
 
 
 
 
 425 Cornelia
 
 
 
 
 
 
 
 
 
 
 
 
 
 
 
 
 
 
 
 1232 Cortusa
 
 
 
 
 915 Cosette
 
 644 Cosima
 
 
 
 
 
 
 
 
 
 
 2026 Cottrell
 
 
 
 
 
 
 
 
 
 
 
 
 
 
 
 
 
 
 
 
 
 
 
 
 
 
 
 
 
 
 
 
 
 
 
 
 
 
 
 
 
 
 
 
 83982 Crantor
 
 
 
 
 
 10046 Creighton
 
 486 Cremona
 660 Crescentia
 
 
 
 
 
 
 
 1140 Crimea
 
 
 
 
 
 
 
 
 
 
 589 Croatia
 
 1220 Crocus
 
 
 
 
 
 
 
 
 
 
 
 
 
 
 
 
 3753 Cruithne
 
 
 
 
 
 
 
 
 
 
 
 
 
 
 
 
 
 
 7641 Cteatus
 
 
 
 
 
 
 
 
 
 
 
 
 
 
 
 
 
 
 1754 Cunningham
 4183 Cuno
 763 Cupido
 15017 Cuppy
 
 
 
 
 
 
 
 
 
 
 
 
 
 
 1917 Cuyo
 
 
 
 403 Cyane
 
 
 65 Cybele
 
 1106 Cydonia
 52975 Cyllarus
 
 
 
 
 
 
 
 
 133 Cyrene

See also 
 List of minor planet discoverers
 List of observatory codes

References 
 

Lists of minor planets by name